The urban districts and rural districts of Northern Ireland had their origin in 1899, when the Local Government (Ireland) Act 1898 came into effect.  They were based on the system of district councils introduced in England and Wales four years earlier.  (See List of Irish local government areas 1898–1921 for a historical list of districts in all of Ireland.)

At the time of Northern Ireland's creation in 1921, Ireland as a whole was divided into thirty-three administrative counties and six county boroughs; the administrative counties were in turn subdivided into a number of boroughs, urban districts, and rural districts.  Each district was itself divided into a number of district electoral divisions.  Northern Ireland received a total of six administrative counties, together with the county boroughs of Belfast and Derry.  The six administrative counties all included a number of urban and rural districts in 1921, but no boroughs.

Evolution and reform
Urban District Councils could petition for a charter of incorporation, changing the status of the urban district to that of a Borough. The following districts became boroughs in this way:
 Bangor by letters patent dated 30 December 1927, taking effect on 23 January 1928; 
 Coleraine by letters patent dated 29 December 1928, taking effect on 23 January 1929; 
 Newtownards by letters patent dated 8 November 1937, taking effect on 23 May 1938; 
 Ballymena by letters patent dated 21 December 1937, taking effect on 23 May 1939; 
 Larne by letters patent dated 15 November 1938, taking effect on 23 May 1939; 
 Portadown by letters patent dated 24 July 1947, taking effect on 2 October 1947; 
 Enniskillen by letters patent dated 29 April 1949, taking effect on 30 May 1949; 
 Carrickfergus by letters patent dated 27 May 1949, taking effect on 1 July 1949; 
 Lurgan by letters patent dated 27 May 1949, taking effect on 7 July 1949; and 
 Lisburn by letters patent dated 24 March 1964, taking effect on 2 June 1964.

A small number of districts were abolished or created after 1921.

The entire system of local government in Northern Ireland was overhauled by the Local Government Act (Northern Ireland) 1972, which replaced the county boroughs, administrative counties, urban districts, and rural districts with 26 local government districts.  The new system came into effect on 1 October 1973.

Urban and rural districts by administrative county

County Antrim

County Armagh

§ Lurgan Rural District was abolished on 1 April 1967, and a small part transferred to Lurgan Borough. The rest was assigned to the new Craigavon Urban District, but Craigavon Development Commission rather than Lurgan Rural District Council became Craigavon Urban District Council.

County Down

County Fermanagh

† All district councils in Fermanagh were abolished in 1968, merging with Fermanagh County Council to create a unitary county council.

County Londonderry

† The district is now known as Derry.

‡ In 1969 Londonderry Rural District was redesignated as Londonderry Urban District, its council was abolished, and its municipal governance transferred to the Londonderry Development Commission, which had also replaced the corporation of Londonderry County Borough (which the rural district surrounded).

County Tyrone

Sources
 Local Government (Boundaries) Act (Northern Ireland) 1971, (Eliz II 19 & 20 c.9)
 Local Government Act (Northern Ireland) 1972 (Eliz II 20 & 21 c.9)
 Local Government (Boundaries) Order (Northern Ireland) 1972 (S.R. & O. 1972, No. 131).

External links

References

Districts
Districts
Northern Ireland
Northern Ireland
Northern Ireland